Mustapha Durak (born 13 August 1988) is a French professional footballer who plays as a right winger for Turkish club Şanlıurfaspor. He is of Turkish descent.

Career
He started his career in the reserve team at his hometown club Strasbourg before moving to Belgium with Excelsior Virton in 2009. He then had a spell with Gap before joining Niort in the summer of 2011. Durak was part of the team that finished as runners-up in the Championnat National in the 2011–12 season, thereby winning promotion to Ligue 2.

It was announced at the end of the 2012–13 campaign that Durak, along with four other players, would not be re-signing with Niort for the following season.

On 6 October 2020, Durak joined Manisa FK.

References

External links
 Mustapha Durak profile at foot-national.com
 
 
 

1988 births
Footballers from Strasbourg
French people of Turkish descent
Living people
French footballers
Association football forwards
RC Strasbourg Alsace players
R.E. Virton players
Gap HAFC players
Chamois Niortais F.C. players
Gaziantepspor footballers
Adana Demirspor footballers
Boluspor footballers
Manisa FK footballers
Şanlıurfaspor footballers
Ligue 2 players
Championnat National players
Süper Lig players
TFF First League players
TFF Second League players
French expatriate footballers
Expatriate footballers in Belgium
French expatriate sportspeople in Belgium
Expatriate footballers in Turkey
French expatriate sportspeople in Turkey